Popular Socialist Party of Mexico (PPSM) is a communist party in Mexico, formed in 1997 after a split from the Popular Socialist Party (PPS).

Cuauhtémoc Amezcua Dromundo is the First Secretary of the Central Committee of the party, Juan Campos Vega is the Second Secretary. Other Central Committee members are Belisario Aguilar Olvera, Dolores del Carmen Chinas Salazar, Adrián García Enríquez, Martha Elvia García García, Luis Miranda Reséndiz, Mario Ochoa Vega, José Santos Cervantes, Jorge Tovar Montañés and José Santos Urbina.

The youth wing of PPSM is the Youth for Socialism (Jóvenes por el Socialismo). PPSM publishes Teoría y Práctica.

Ahead of the 2006 presidential election, PPSM declared that it would not support any candidate. The party is not recognized by the National Electoral Institute.

International relations
The PPSM is politically close to the Workers' Party of Belgium (PTB), and participated in the annual international seminar hosted by WPB.

References

External links
 

1997 establishments in Mexico
Communist parties in Mexico
Far-left politics in Mexico
Political parties established in 1997
Political parties in Mexico

International Meeting of Communist and Workers Parties